Shin-Soo Choo (born July 13, 1982) is a South Korean professional baseball outfielder and designated hitter for the SSG Landers of the KBO League. He has played in Major League Baseball (MLB) for the Seattle Mariners, Cleveland Indians, Cincinnati Reds, and Texas Rangers.

Choo was selected as the Most Valuable Player (MVP) and Best Pitcher of the WBSC U-18 Baseball World Cup as South Korea won the event. Choo signed a $1.35 million contract with the Mariners after the championship and converted to the outfield.

In 2018, Choo earned a selection to his first career Major League Baseball All-Star Game. During that season, he safely reached base in 52 consecutive games, the longest such single-season streak in Texas Rangers history. As of 2018, he led all active major league ballplayers in career hit by pitch, with 132.

Professional career

Seattle Mariners

Choo made his Major League Baseball debut with the Seattle Mariners on April 21, 2005, but spent most of the 2005 season and the first half of the  season in the minor leagues with the Mariners' Triple-A affiliate, the Tacoma Rainiers. He batted .068 in a handful of major league at-bats over two years. He was traded to the Cleveland Indians along with minor leaguer Shawn Nottingham on July 26, 2006, for first baseman Ben Broussard.

Cleveland Indians

Two days after being traded, Choo hit a solo home run against his former club in a 1–0 Indians victory. In 45 games with the Indians, he batted .295 (43 for 146) with three home runs and 22 RBIs.

He spent the first few weeks of the 2007 regular season with the Buffalo Bisons, a Triple-A team in the International League affiliated with the Indians, before being called up on April 23, 2007, to take the place of the injured third baseman Andy Marte. He was optioned back to Buffalo on May 3. Choo missed several months of the 2007 season due to injury and in September 2007 underwent Tommy John surgery on his left elbow.

In the 2008 season, Choo was called up on May 31 and spent the rest of the season with the Indians. He finished the season (after 317 at-bats) with a .309 batting average, 98 hits, 14 home runs, and 66 RBIs. His hit and RBI totals were also a new record by a South Korean-born player in the MLB. Thanks to a hot September where he put up a .400 batting average, 34 hits, 5 home runs, and 24 RBIs, Choo was named the AL Player of the Month.

In February 2009, he signed a one-year contract with the Indians. During that season, he broke his own records for home runs, RBIs, stolen bases and hits. On July 3, Choo hit two home runs and a career-high seven RBIs in an Indians 15–3 victory over the Oakland Athletics. On October 3, 2009, Choo hit his twentieth homer off of Paul Byrd of the Boston Red Sox, thus joining the 20-20 club. He is the first Asian to accomplish this feat in the Major Leagues. He was also the only player in the AL to have a .300 average, 20 home runs, and 20 stolen bases at the same time. He finished the season with 20 home runs, 21 steals, 86 RBIs, and a .300 batting average.

Choo became eligible for arbitration after the 2010 season, and agreed to a $3.975 million deal. Choo hit three home runs in a road game against the Kansas City Royals on September 17, 2010. He first hit a two-run homer 420 ft to right in the top of the fourth inning. In his next at bat he hit a towering grand slam to deep center. In the top of the eighth Choo hit a 405 ft solo homer over the right field wall. Choo finished the game a three-run homer away from the elusive "home run cycle". On September 19, 2010, Choo again reached the 20-20 club of 20 home runs and 20 stolen bases for the second straight year. He also led the AL right fielders in assists with 14.

Choo finished the 2011 season with eight home runs, a .259 batting average, 12 stolen bases, and 36 RBIs while accumulating 78 strikeouts and 36 walks in 313 at-bats. On June 24, Choo was hit by San Francisco Giants pitcher Jonathan Sánchez on his left thumb. The resulting fracture kept him out for six weeks. On August 23, during the first game of a double header against his former club, the Seattle Mariners, a game in which during an earthquake he hit a double. In the ninth inning, Choo hit his first walk-off home run. On September 1, Choo pulled a side muscle and was placed on the disabled list again, ending his season.

On April 14, 2012, in a game against the Kansas City Royals which would see bench clearings by both teams, Choo was hit by Royals starter Jonathan Sánchez on his right knee. It was a pitch from Sanchez that hit Choo in 2011, resulting in a broken thumb and nearly two months on the disabled list. Choo would finish the game and win it for the Indians in the tenth inning when he hit a two-run double. On April 24, Choo left in the eighth inning in a game versus the Royals after suffering a mild hamstring strain. Choo would return on May 2 in a 6–3 Indians win versus the Chicago White Sox. On May 24 in series finale home game against the Detroit Tigers, Choo hit a second-deck home run off of Tigers starter Justin Verlander in the first inning. That was Choo's first career lead-off home run. The Indians won that game 2–1, finishing the sweep against the Tigers.

Cincinnati Reds

On December 11, 2012, Choo was traded to the Cincinnati Reds along with Jason Donald in a three team, nine player deal also involving the Arizona Diamondbacks. The trade brought Trevor Bauer, Matt Albers, Bryan Shaw, and Drew Stubbs to the Cleveland Indians. On February 11, 2013, Choo avoided arbitration with his new team, the Reds, by agreeing to a one-year, $7.375 million deal, the exact midpoint between both sides.

On May 8, 2013, Choo hit a walk-off home run in the bottom of the 9th inning in a game with the Atlanta Braves. It was his second walk-off home run in Major League Baseball. On August 27 in a game against the St. Louis Cardinals, Choo hit his 100th career home run. On September 9, 2013, Choo set the Reds' team record for hit by pitches in a season. For the season, he led the major leagues in hit by pitch, with 26. On October 2, 2013 Choo homered in the top of the 8th inning in the wild-card game against the Pittsburgh Pirates. He is the first South Korean batter to hit a home run in Major League Baseball postseason.

Texas Rangers

On December 21, 2013, it was reported that Choo had agreed to a seven-year, $130 million contract with the Texas Rangers, pending a physical examination. The Rangers officially introduced Choo on December 27. In his first season with the team, he battled ankle injuries and played in only 123 games while putting up a slash line of .242/.340/.374; making 2014 the worst season of his ten-year career.  It was a major blow to the Rangers as they heavily invested that he and newly acquired Prince Fielder would contribute to help the team win a division title. Instead he was added unto the long list of injuries that kept the Rangers out of contention along with Prince Fielder, Mitch Moreland, Matt Harrison, Derek Holland, and many others.

On July 21, 2015, Choo hit for the cycle against the Colorado Rockies at Coors Field. In doing so, he became the ninth player in Rangers history to hit for the cycle as well as the first Asian player in the MLB to accomplish this feat. He vastly improved in 2015 compared to his injury-riddled 2014. In a crucial role, he hit .276 with 22 home runs and 82 RBIs with a .375 OBP. Brandon Warne of Fangraphs noted that Choo's on-base percentage in 2015 was higher than his slugging percentage in 2014. During the 7th inning of the deciding Game 5 of the 2015 American League Divisional Series Choo was involved in a bizarre play which saw a routine throw back to the mound by the catcher deflect off Choo's bat, resulting in an errant ball which then led to the runner on third base score a run. Since Choo was inside the batter's box, he was ruled to have not interfered on the play, thereby allowing the run to stand. This play was one of several notable plays in the 7th inning, which is considered to be among the most dramatic innings in playoff history.

On April 10, 2016, the Rangers placed Choo on the 15-day disabled list with a strained right calf muscle and was expected to miss 4–6 weeks. He returned on May 20 having missed 36 games. In his first game back, he left with hamstring tightness and was placed back on the DL. He was activated on June 13 having missed 21 games. On July 20, Choo was placed on the disabled list for third time in the season, this time for lower back inflammation. He returned on August 4 after 13 games. On August 16, 2016, it was announced that Choo would miss the rest of the season when he was placed on the 15-day disabled list (his fourth stint on the DL that season) with a fracture in his left forearm.

On May 26, 2018, Choo hit a walk-off home run against Kevin McCarthy of the Kansas City Royals. With 176 career home runs, Choo surpassed Hideki Matsui for the most career home runs by a player born in Asia. Choo, having set a club record for reaching base in 47 consecutive games, was named to his first-career All-Star Game in July. On July 20, Choo extended his on-base streak to 52 games with a lead-off single against the Cleveland Indians; the streak ended on July 21 in a second game against the Indians. Choo's 52-game on-base streak is the longest such single-season streak in Texas Rangers history.
Choo was named the 2018 Texas Rangers Player of the Year by the DFW BBWAA chapter.

On April 4, 2019, Choo recorded his 1,500th career major league hit with a single against Matt Harvey of the Los Angeles Angels. In 2019, he hit .265/.371/.455/.826 with 24 home runs and 64 RBI. He was the 8th-oldest player in the American League. Following the 2019 season, Choo underwent arthroscopic AC joint debridement surgery on his left shoulder.

During the COVID-19 pandemic-shortened season, Choo hit .236/.323/.400 with 5 home runs and 15 RBIs in 33 games.

SSG Landers
On February 21, 2021, Choo agreed to a one-year, $2.4MM contract with the SSG Landers of the Korea Baseball Organization (KBO). Choo played in 136 games for the team in 2021, slashing .263/.409/.450 with 21 home runs and 69 RBI. On November 16, 2021, Choo re-signed with the Landers on a one-year, $2.3 million contract.

World Baseball Classic
Choo was on the 2009 World Baseball Classic South Korean roster. Cleveland allowed Choo to play under the condition that he play only one game or less as an outfielder in the first round, and only in two non-consecutive games of the second round. Cleveland lifted this restriction from the semifinals on, and Choo started as an outfielder in the semifinal match against Venezuela. He helped South Korea win 10–2 against Venezuela with a three-run home run against Carlos Silva in the first inning. He also contributed a solo home run in the fifth inning in the finals against Hisashi Iwakuma of Japan, where South Korea lost to Japan 5–3.

Personal life
Choo and his wife Won-mi Ha have three children: Moobin (b. 2004), Kunwoo (b. 2010), and Sohui(b. 2011). While playing as a minor leaguer in the U.S. and making just $350 a week, Choo would skip meals to save money to buy diapers for Alan. Choo is the nephew of Park Jeong-Tae, a former second baseman for the Lotte Giants. Choo has been a close friend of Lee Dae-Ho, former infielder with the Seattle Mariners organization, since attending the same elementary school together.

In the early morning of Monday, May 2, 2011, Choo was arrested and charged with drunk driving in Sheffield Lake, Ohio. He was pulled over by police around 2:25 a.m. because his vehicle was weaving, and Choo's blood alcohol content (via Breathalyzer test) was reportedly .20%, more than twice the legal limit. He apologized to his team and fans for this incident.

During the COVID-19 pandemic, Choo donated $1,000 to each of the 190 players in the Texas Rangers’ minor league system who were unable to work due to MLB's shutdown. He also donated $200,000 to the nonprofit Community Chest of Korea to help the city of Daegu, which was the hardest hit city in Korea during the pandemic.

In popular culture
 Choo has appeared in Running Man, with Hyun-jin Ryu on ep 119.
 Choo has appeared in 2 Days & 1 Night season 3, episodes 422-424, initially wanting to join the show as a short-term intern cast during his off-season. However, due to funding problems, the show's staffs had to eliminate him from being a continuous cast member.
 Choo as a character appeared in Reply 1997, on season 1, episode 8, depicting his days as a high school baseball player in Korea, played by Choo's actual younger brother, actor Min-ki Chu.

Walk up songs 

 Gangnam Style by Psy (April 2014)
 International Love by Pitbull (April 2014)
 Turn Down for What by DJ Snake & Lil Jon (April 2014)
 Regulate by Warren G (June 2016)
 Despacito - Remix by Luis Fonsi (July 2017) 
 Fire by BTS (April 2018)

See also
 List of Major League Baseball players who hit for the cycle

References

External links

1982 births
Living people
American League All-Stars
Seattle Mariners players
Cleveland Indians players
Cincinnati Reds players
Texas Rangers players
Arizona League Mariners players
Wisconsin Timber Rattlers players
San Bernardino Stampede players
Inland Empire 66ers of San Bernardino players
San Antonio Missions players
Tacoma Rainiers players
Buffalo Bisons (minor league) players
Gulf Coast Indians players
Akron Aeros players
Lake County Captains players
2009 World Baseball Classic players
Asian Games medalists in baseball
Major League Baseball players from South Korea
South Korean expatriate baseball players in the United States
Major League Baseball outfielders
Busan High School alumni
Sportspeople from Busan
Baseball players at the 2010 Asian Games
Peoria Javelinas players
Asian Games gold medalists for South Korea
Medalists at the 2010 Asian Games
Jeonju Chu clan